The Diana Prosperity or Reardon Smith Line Ltd v Yngvar Hansen-Tangen and Sanko SS & Co Ltd [1976] 1 WLR 989 is a landmark English contract law case. It heralded a new contextual approach to interpretation of contracts.

Facts
A charterparty described the ship to be chartered as "called Yard no 354 at Osaka". Osaka was the name of the yard responsible for building the ship, although the building was subcontracted to another yard, Oshima. The Osaka yard could not handle a tankship of that size. Both parties knew this. But the buyers, wanting to get out of the contract for another reason, argued that the ship did not correspond with the description under s 13 of the Sale of Goods Act 1979.

Judgment
The House of Lords held that the words used did not fall under s 13, because they were merely labelling which vessel was involved. In the course of the decision, Lord Wilberforce stated that in construing a contract, the Court must,

The hull number and yard had no particular significance. The description needs to focus on the goods not excessively technical arguments.

See also
Investors Compensation Scheme Ltd v West Bromwich Building Society [1998] 1 All ER 98

Notes

References
C Mitchell and P Mitchell (eds), Landmark Cases in the Law of Contract (2008)
Bishop, Beale and Furmston, Contract Cases and Materials (2008) 429, who give a useful analogy for this case, "if Furmston were to sell his cottage, 'known as Denning's Orchard' to Beale, would Beale be able to get out of the contract on the grounds that the cottage had never belonged to anyone called Denning and didn't have a single fruit tree in the grounds?"

English contract case law
English interpretation case law
House of Lords cases
1976 in case law
1976 in British law